

This is a list of the National Register of Historic Places listings in Adams County, Nebraska.

This is intended to be a complete list of the properties and districts on the National Register of Historic Places in Adams County, Nebraska, United States.  The locations of National Register properties and districts for which the latitude and longitude coordinates are included below, may be seen in a map.

There are 21 properties and districts listed on the National Register in the county.  There are also two former listings.

Current listings 

|}

Former listings 

|}

See also 
 List of National Historic Landmarks in Nebraska
 National Register of Historic Places listings in Nebraska

References

External links 

 –Nebraska State Historical Society

 
Buildings and structures in Adams County, Nebraska
Adams